Ləcədi (also, Ledzhedi, Ləcdi, and Ledzhedy) is a village in the Davachi Rayon of Azerbaijan.  The village forms part of the municipality of Qələgah.

References 

Populated places in Shabran District